Tracy Lamar Greene is a former American football tight end who played for two different teams, the Kansas City Chiefs and the Pittsburgh Steelers. Greene was selected in the 219th pick of the seventh round of the 1994 NFL draft by the Kansas City Chiefs. He participated in the 1995-96 NFL playoffs and in Super Bowl XXX.

External links 
 NFL.com - 1994 NFL Draft

References 

1972 births
Living people
American football tight ends
Pittsburgh Steelers players
Kansas City Chiefs players
Grambling State Tigers football players
Players of American football from Louisiana
People from Monroe, Louisiana